Shirley Clifford Atchley  (14 January 1871 – 20 June 1936) was a British diplomat and botanist.

Career 
Atchley was a translator with local rank of First Secretary in HM Diplomatic Service, HM Legation, Athens. He published on the life of Lord Byron in Greece and an account of the flora of Attica with the editorial assistance of W.B. Turrill.

Bibliography

Honours 
 1924 Officer of the Order of the British Empire (OBE), Local First Secretary at His Majesty's Legation at Athens
 1930 Companion of the Order of St Michael and St George (CMG) Translator at His Majesty's Legation at Athens

Personal life 
Atchley married Anastasia Zersi Gerasi in 1893, they had two daughters Alexandra Ismene Atchley and Virginia Athenais Atchley. Alexandra married the diplomat Pierson Dixon, and Virginia also married a diplomat, Claud Russell.

Atchley died while climbing Mount Kyllini, Greece. Although an experienced mountaineer he had been suffering from heart problems, this with the height of the mountain was the apparent cause.

References

External links 
 Who's Who entry

1871 births
1936 deaths
20th-century British botanists
Companions of the Order of St Michael and St George
Officers of the Order of the British Empire
Mountaineering deaths